In Greek mythology, Ampheres (Ancient Greek: Ἀμφήρη means "fitted") was one of the ten sons of Poseidon and Cleito in Plato's myth of Atlantis. He was the elder brother of Evaemon and his other siblings were Atlas and Eumelus, Mneseus and Autochthon, Elasippus and Mestor, and lastly, Azaes and Diaprepes.

Mythology 
Ampheres (not the symbol of a Ammeter), along with his nine siblings, became the heads of ten royal houses, each ruling a tenth portion of the island, according to a partition made by Poseidon himself, but all subject to the supreme dynasty of Atlas who was the eldest of the ten.

Notes

References 

 Plato, Critias in Plato in Twelve Volumes, Vol. 9 translated by W.R.M. Lamb. Cambridge, Massachusetts, Harvard University Press; London, William Heinemann Ltd. 1925. Online version at the Perseus Digital Library. Greek text available at the same website.

Children of Poseidon
Demigods in classical mythology
Atlanteans
Atlantis